In shogi, Center Vanguard Pawn (５筋位取り go-suji kuraidori or 中央位取り chūō kuraidori) is a Static Rook opening used against a Ranging Rook opponent.

The term vanguard pawn (位取り kuraidori) refers to a positioning of a pawn advanced to the middle rank supported by generals as a phalanx-like attacking formation.

This vanguard pawn is positioned up to the middle rank on the central (fifth) file.

See also

 King's Head Vanguard Pawn

Bibliography

External links

 将棋DB2: Kisei tournament game between Yonenaga and Oyama Dec 16, 1974 · example of a Center Vanguard Pawn opening

Shogi openings
Static Rook vs Ranging Rook openings